During the 1993–94 English football season, Sheffield Wednesday competed in the FA Premier League.

Season summary
Sheffield Wednesday finished seventh in the league for the second season running, but they could have finished even higher had key striker David Hirst not missed so much of the season due to injury. Young striker Gordon Watson proved himself to be a highly competent deputy, scoring 12 league goals in his first season as a regular player.

Veterans Chris Waddle, Chris Woods and Mark Bright were also impressive, showing little sign of their advancing years, despite all three players now being in their 30s.

Wednesday's best success in 1993–94 came in the League Cup. They reached the semi-finals but were defeated by Manchester United in the semi-final, which included Ryan Giggs scoring a classic goal for United in the first leg. This ended any hope of the Owls winning a major trophy or qualifying for Europe. Trevor Francis responded to this disappointment by signing Klas Ingesson and Guy Whittingham to give the strikeforce some much-needed support. These reinforcements also gave Owls fans some much-needed hope of silverware, a year after they'd been on the losing side in both domestic cup finals.

Final league table

Results
Sheffield Wednesday's score comes first

Legend

FA Premier League

FA Cup

League Cup

Players

First-team squad
Squad at end of season

Left club during season

Reserve squad

References

Notes

Sheffield Wednesday F.C. seasons
Sheffield Wednesday